This is a list of airports in Singapore, grouped by type and sorted by location. As of 2022, the country has a total of 9 airports. Singapore is also a city-state.



Airports 

Airport names shown in bold have scheduled passenger service on commercial airlines now.

See also 

 List of heliports in Singapore
 List of airports by ICAO code: W#WS - Singapore
 Transport in Singapore

References 
 
 
 Airports in Singapore. World Aero Data.
 Airports in Singapore. The Airport Guide.
 Airports in Singapore. Great Circle Mapper.
 

 
Singapore
Airports
Airports
Singapore